Assat is a railway station in Assat, Nouvelle-Aquitaine, France. The station is located on the Toulouse – Bayonne railway line. The station is served by TER (local) services operated by the SNCF.

Train services

The station is served by regional trains towards Bordeaux, Bayonne, Pau and Tarbes.

References

Railway stations in France opened in 1867
Railway stations in Pyrénées-Atlantiques